Massa Lemu is a visual artist and writer from Malawi who works in painting, drawing, performance and text-based conceptual work. He describe his art as "interventions and descriptions of the disputed social space we all live in".

Early life and education 
Massa Lemu was born in 1979 in Blantyre. His early artistic influence was his late uncle, David Zuze, who painted as a hobby; Lemu watched his uncle paint.

Lemu received his Bachelor of Education Degree (with a major in Fine Arts) from the University of Malawi in 2003 and Master of Arts in Painting from the Savannah College of Art and Design (USA) in 2009.

Work 

Lemu's paintings include combinations of natural, human-made, and imaginary aspects as part of commenting on issues. His performance work includes using street corners and other sites often occupied by undocumented people, as part of work about migration.

Lemu has shown his work in galleries in Malawi and the United States. His work has been reviewed in publications including Texphrastic, Cite (Houston, Texas), Reflections (Blantyre, Malawi) and Steve Chimombo's book titled Aids, Artists and Authors (Zomba, Malawi).

He has taught courses at universities including Virginia Commonwealth University in Richmond, Virginia, and Rice University in Houston, Texas.

Lemu was a Core Critical Studies Fellow in the Glassell School of Art at the Museum of Fine Arts, Houston from 2010 to 2012, where he researched and wrote about contemporary African art. Lemu researched on the biopolitics of contemporary African art collectives as a PhD student at Stellenbosch University.

Exhibitions

Selected solo exhibitions

2013: PRECARIOT (Lawndale Arts Center, Houston) 
PRECARIOT is a self-portrait of the artist as a continental drifter in perpetual precarity. The Precariat is a term that combines the word “proletariat” with “precarious” to describe an emerging “barbarian” class of migrant laborers and professionals living and working precariously, holding temporary underpaid jobs, lacking a political voice and increasingly frustrated by their living and working conditions. Lemu says that he is attracted by its revolutionary aspects, embracing the label and adopting it as his title. For Lemu, the old patriot was proud of, and ready to die for fatherland, the “precariot” however is one whose only possession is the unstable and indeterminate terrain of precarity, staking claims and maneuvering in this uncertain landscape. PRECARIOT focuses on processes of inspection and scrutiny, labeling and branding to highlight the realities of migration.

2012: Passages for the Undocumented (Rice University, Houston) 
According to Lemu, Passages for the Undocumented began more than a year ago in response to a practical problem many artists face – lack of space to showcase his art. Inspired by the panhandlers he encountered, Lemu started to imitate their method, writing his own slogans on cardboard signs and standing on street corners around Houston. The slogans concentrate Lemu's experience as a third-world migrant artist into statements that combine conceptual art practice with transcultural displacement.

Stranded Fishes and Masks on Wheelchairs (Malawian Embassy, Washington DC) 
In Stranded Fishes and Masks on Wheelchairs, the paintings in the exhibition used the Gule Wamkulu Mask of the Chewa peoples of Malawi as a departure point to talk about a range of themes such as inclusion and exclusion, determination and resilience. The show also included pictures that use the image of the fish, chambo in particular, to talk about migration, exploitation, and pollution. The artist was inspired to use the image of the fish as metaphor for migration and pollution when he saw East African Tilapia fishes in the polluted concrete bayous of Houston in 2010.

2006 
 This Scourge is also a Mask (French Cultural Center, Blantyre)
 Primal Forces (Capital Hotel, Lilongwe)

2003 
 Multiple Suns (French Cultural Center, Blantyre)

Selected group exhibitions

2013 
 Do It. A Hans Ulrich Obrist Collaboration (Houston)
 First Aid Kit (Rice University, Houston)

2012 
 Of Other Spaces (Dallas)
 Dallas Biennale (Dallas)

2011 
 Houston Art Fair, (Houston) 
 Material Traces; Selections from Core 2011 (Dallas)

2009 
 An Evenly Measured Space (Savannah)

2008 
 404/912, conceptual works by artists from Atlanta and Savannah (Atlanta)

Publications
As a writer, Lemu has been published in the following:

 2016: Play and the Profane in Samson Kambalu's Holyballs, Holyballism and (Bookworm) The Fall of Man, Stedelijk Studies 
 2014: For the Ranter the Whole World is a Playground C& online magazine http://www.contemporaryand.com
 2013: What Part of Love is Universal? C& Magazine
 2013: Dialogue; The Progress of Love The Menil Collection and Pulitzer Foundation, http://www.theprogressoflove.com
 2012: Danfo, Molue and the Afropolitan Experience in Emeka Ogboh’s Soundscapes 2011-2012 
 CORE Catalogue Museum of Fine Art, Houston

See also 
 Kay Chiromo

References 

Malawian artists
Living people
People from Blantyre
Year of birth missing (living people)